The Hashidate class gunboat was a class of two Imperial Japanese Navy gunboats which served during World War II. The class consisted of 2 vessels, Hashidate and Uji. During World War II the number of their AA guns was increased and they were also equipped with depth charges.

 
Gunboat classes